An election for 16 Scottish representative peers took place on Monday 23 May 1955 at the Parliament House in Edinburgh.

Procedure
The venue for the meeting caused some difficulty as the general election was called for the week when the General Assembly of the Church of Scotland was due to meet; by tradition the Church would not meet on the day of the general election, which meant the only day for the Peers to meet was Monday 23 May. This was the day before the Church Assembly opened and the day on which the Lord High Commissioner to the General Assembly of the Church of Scotland took up residence at Holyrood Palace, which was the normal location for the Peers to meet. Instead it was decided the peers should meet at Parliament House, built for the Parliament of Scotland but now part of the law courts. The Lord President of the Court of Session and the Faculty of Advocates agreed to the use of Parliament House.

Accordingly, the date, time and place of the meeting was set in a Royal Proclamation of 6 May 1955. Lord Elphinstone, who held the role of Lord Clerk Register, presided for the last time. When the Principal Clerk of Session George Watson read the roll of Peers of Scotland, 113 names were read, and 32 answered that they were present. Lord Polwarth produced a proxy on behalf of the Duke of Montrose, and 22 Peers had submitted "Signed Lists" as a form of absent voting. Lord Elphinstone himself chose not to vote; this was the "customary but not compulsory practice" of the Lord Clerk Register.

Result

Two new representative peers were elected who had not sat in the previous Parliament - Lord Forbes and Lord Reay.

Votes cast

See also
 List of Scottish representative peers

References

 "MINUTES OF MEETING held on the 23rd May, 1955, of PEERS OF SCOTLAND for the ELECTION OF THEIR REPRESENTATIVES to sit and vote in the ensuing Parliament of Great Britain and Northern Ireland." House of Lords paper 4 of Session 1955–56, HMSO.

Peerage of Scotland
1955 elections in the United Kingdom
1955 in Scotland
Scottish representative peers